Glaciimonas alpina is a bacterium from the genus of Glaciimonas which has been isolated from cryoconite from the Tiefenbachferner glacier in Austria.

References

Burkholderiales
Bacteria described in 2015